Dendrobium aemulum, commonly known as the ironbark feather orchid or white feather orchid, is an epiphytic orchid in the family Orchidaceae and grows on trees that retain their bark, especially ironbarks. It has reddish or purplish pseudobulbs, two to four leathery leaves and up to seven white, feathery flowers. It grows in open forest in Queensland and New South Wales.

Description 
The sepals and petals all spread widely, drooping and often turning pink as they age. The side lobes are pointed and curve upwards and the middle lobe curves downwards. Flowering occurs from August to October. The flowers are reputed to produce a sweet scent at night, "suggesting pollination by night-flying insects".

Taxonomy and naming
Dendrobium aemulum was first formally described in 1810 by Robert Brown and the description was published in the Prodromus Florae Novae Hollandiae et Insulae Van Diemen. The specific epithet (aemula) is Latin word meaning "emulating" or "rivalling".

Distribution and habitat
The ironbark feather orchid grows on trees that do not lose their bark, including ironbarks, brush box (Lophostemon confertus) and cypress pine (Callitris species). It is found between the Calliope Range near Gladstone in Queensland and Moruya in New South Wales growing in open forest from the coast to nearby tablelands.

References

External links
IOSPE orchid photos, Dendrobium aemulum R. Brown 1810, Photo © Lourens Grobler.
Australian Native Orchid Society Queensland, KABI Group, Dendrobium aemulum
Toowoomba Plants, natives of the region suitable for gardens, Thursday July 31, 2008: Ironbark Orchid, Dendrobium aemulum (Tropilis aemula)

aemulum
Orchids of Oceania
Orchids of Australia
Orchids of New Caledonia
Orchids of New South Wales
Orchids of Queensland
Plants described in 1810
Garden plants of Australasia